Adrien Deghelt (born 10 May 1985) is a Belgian hurdler.

Biography
As a junior Deghelt won the silver medal at the 2007 European U23 Championships. He competed at the 2007 World Championships, the 2008 World Indoor Championships, the 2009 World Championships and the 2010 World Indoor Championships without reaching the final. He then won the bronze medal at the 2011 European Indoor Championships.

Deghelt's personal best is 13.42 seconds, achieved in August 2012 in London. In the 60 metres hurdles he has 7.57 seconds, achieved at the 2011 European Indoor Championships.

He is coached by Jonathan Nsenga.

References

1985 births
Living people
Belgian male hurdlers
Athletes (track and field) at the 2012 Summer Olympics
Olympic athletes of Belgium
Sportspeople from Namur (city)